David Schnaderbeck (born 17 March 1992) is an Austrian footballer who plays for SV Lebring.

References

Austrian footballers
Austrian Football Bundesliga players
1992 births
Living people
SK Sturm Graz players
Association football midfielders